Wild Orchids is the 18th studio album by Steve Hackett, released in 2006. It follows on from the success of the previous studio outings To Watch the Storms in 2003 and Metamorpheus in 2005. The album is released in three formats including a standard and special editions. There is also a Japanese edition with two extra tracks not included on the UK releases.

Track listing
All songs written by Steve Hackett; except "Transylvanian Express" and "A Dark Night in Toytown" by Hackett, King, Glück; "Waters of the Wild" and "Down Street" by Hackett, King; "Set Your Compass" by S.Hackett, John Hackett; "Ego & Id" by J.Hackett, N.Clabburn; "Man in the Long Black Coat" by Bob Dylan
 "A Dark Night in Toytown"
 "Waters of the Wild"
 "Set Your Compass"
 "Down Street"
 "A Girl Called Linda"
 "To a Close"
 "Ego & Id"
 "Man in the Long Black Coat"
 "Wolfwork"
 "Why"
 "She Moves in Memories"
 "The Fundamentals of Brainwashing"
 "Howl"

 Special Edition (CAMCD38SE) – includes four extra tracks and packaged in slipcase.
 "Transylvanian Express" – 3:44
 "Waters of the Wild" – 5:35
 "Set Your Compass" – 3:38
 "Down Street" – 7:34
 "A Girl Called Linda" – 4:44
 "Blue Child" – 4:25
 "To a Close" – 4:49
 "Ego & Id" – 4:08
 "Man in the Long Black Coat" – 5:07
 "Cedars of Lebanon" – 4:02
 "Wolfwork" – 4:49
 "Why" – 0:47
 "She Moves in Memories" – 5:00
 "The Fundamentals of Brainwashing" – 3:01
 "Howl" – 4:31
 "A Dark Night in Toytown" – 3:42
 "Until the Last Butterfly" – 2:29

 Japanese Edition (IECP-10066) – includes 2 new extra tracks, obi strip and packaged in slipcase.
 "Transylvanian Express"
 "Waters of the Wild"
 "Set Your Compass"
 "Down Street"
 "A Girl Called Linda"
 "To a Close"
 "Ego & Id"
 "Man in the Long Black Coat"
 "Cedars of Lebanon"
 "Wolfwork"
 "Why"
 "She Moves in Memories"
 "The Fundamentals of Brainwashing"
 "Howl"
 "A Dark Night in Toytown"
 Eruption
 Reconditioned Nightmare

 Digital Downloads
 "Man in the Long Black Coat" (edit)
 "The Fundamentals of Brainwashing" (edit)

Personnel 
 Steve Hackett – Guitars, Electric Sitar, Harmonica, Psaltery, Optigan & Voices
 Roger King – Keyboards and Programming, and Rhythm Guitar on "Down Street".
John Hackett – Principal Flute on "To A Close", "She Moves in Memories", "Cedars of Lebanon" & Riff Guitar on "Ego & Id"
 Rob Townsend – Saxes, Principal Flute on "Linda", Alto Flute on "She Moves in Memories", Tin Whistle and Bass Clarinet.
 Gary O'Toole – Drums and Harmony Voices.
 Nick Magnus – Keyboards on "Ego & Id".
 The Underworld Orchestra: 
 Christine Townsend – Principal Violin, Viola
 Richard Stewart – Cello
 Dick Driver – Double Bass
 Colin Clague – Trumpet
 Chris Redgate – Oboe, Cor Anglais

Facts 
 "A Dark Night In Toytown" and "Transylvanian Express" are based on the live track "If You Can’t Find Heaven" from the To Watch the Storms 2004 European Tour. "Reconditioned Nightmare", based again from the 'To Watch the Storms' live set, is a new re-recording of the original track "Air Conditioned Nightmare" from Cured.
 "Ego & Id" was originally featured on John Hackett's solo debut Checking Out of London which features Steve on guitars. The Wild Orchids version has Steve on deeper pitched vocals.
 "The Man in the Long Black Coat" is a cover version of the song by Bob Dylan.
 "Eruption" is a short cover version of the lengthy suite by Focus. (More precisely, the "Tommy" section)
 This is the second Steve Hackett album to offer a limited edition EPK of the album (available on Camino Records website).
 There are a series of mistakes on the sleeve to the album.
No credit on the sleeve as to who plays bass.
Some of the lyrics to "Down Street" were not printed. (Full lyrics here).
On "Cedars of Lebanon", the last few lines I long to show you... were reused twice in the sleeve, though not used on the recording.
 This is the last Hackett album with a cover designed by his second wife Kim Poor as they separated after the release of the album.

References

2006 albums
Steve Hackett albums